The 22953 / 22954 Gujarat Express is a Superfast Express train belonging to Indian Railways that run between  and  in India.

It operates as train number 22953 from Mumbai Central to Ahmedabad Junction and as train number 22954 in the reverse direction.

Coaches

22953/22954 Gujarat Superfast Express presently has 3 AC Chair Car, 2 1st Class, 10 2nd Class seating & 8 General Unreserved coaches.

As with most train services in India, coach composition may be amended at the discretion of Indian Railways depending on demand.

Service

22953 Gujarat Superfast Express covers the distance of 491 kilometres in 9 hours (55 km/hr) & 9 hours 25 mins as 22954 Gujarat Superfast Express (55 km/hr).

As the average speed of the train is above 55 km/hr, as per Indian Railways rules, its fare includes a Superfast surcharge.

Gallery 

Mumbai–Ahmedabad trains
Express trains in India